The 1990 New York City Marathon was the 21st running of the annual marathon race in New York City, United States, which took place on Sunday, November 4. The men's elite race was won by Kenya's Douglas Wakiihuri in a time of 2:12:39 hours while the women's race was won by Poland's Wanda Panfil in 2:30:45.

A total of 23,774 runners finished the race, 19,274 men and 4500 women.

Results

Men

Women

References

Results
Results. Association of Road Racing Statisticians. Retrieved 2020-05-23.

External links
New York Road Runners website

1990
New York City
Marathon
New York City Marathon